The discography of JP Cooper, an English singer and songwriter. His debut studio album, Raised Under Grey Skies, was released in October 2017 and peaked at number nine on the UK Albums Chart. The album spawned seven singles, most notably "September Song", which peaked at number seven on the UK Singles Chart.

Studio albums

Extended plays

Singles

As lead artist

As featured artist

Promotional singles

Other charted and certified songs

Guest appearances

Notes

References

Discographies of British artists